The 1999–2000 Carolina Hurricanes season was the franchise's 21st season in the National Hockey League and third as the Hurricanes. The Hurricanes failed to qualify for the playoffs, despite qualifying the previous year.

Offseason

Regular season

The Hurricanes were the least penalized team during the regular season, with only 253 power-play opportunities against them.

Along with the NHL 2000 patch worn league-wide, Carolina wore Two other patches, one that celebrated their first season at the New Raleigh Entertainment and Sports Arena, and the other in memory of Steve Chiasson, who died in a drunk driving crash after the Hurricanes were eliminated in the quarterfinals of the 1999 Stanley Cup Playoffs.

Final standings

Schedule and results

October

Record for the month 5-3-3-0 (Home 0-1-0-0 Away 5-2-3-0)

November

Record for the month 6-5-3-0 (Home 6-3-1-0 Away 0-2-2-0)

December

Record for the month 3-8-1-0 (Home 2-3-1-0 Away 1-5-0-0)

January

Record for the month 6-8-1-0 (Home 4-4-1-0 Away 2-4-0-0)

February

Record for the month 6-4-1-0 (Home 2-2-1-0 Away 4-2-0-0)

March

Record for the month 8-6-1-0 (Home 4-3-1-0 Away 4-3-0-0)

April

Record for the month 3-1-0-0 (Home 2-0-0-0 Away 1-1-0-0)

Player statistics

Regular season
Scoring

Goaltending

Awards and records

Transactions

Draft picks

Carolina's picks at the 1999 NHL Entry Draft in Boston, Massachusetts. The Hurricanes have the 16th overall pick.

Farm teams

International Hockey League
The Cincinnati Cyclones are the Hurricanes International Hockey League affiliate for the 1999–2000 IHL season.

East Coast Hockey League
The Florida Everblades are the Hurricanes East Coast Hockey League affiliate.

References
 

Carol
Carol
Carolina Hurricanes seasons
Hurr
Hurr